Centenary Park may refer to:
Centenary Park in Croydon, New South Wales, Australia
Urban Council Centenary Garden in Tsim Sha Tsui East, Kowloon, Hong Kong
Centenary Park in Bulawayo, Zimbabwe
Centenary Park, the baseball park of Centenary Gentlemen baseball, Centenary College of Louisiana
Chulalongkorn University Centenary Park in Bangkok, Thailand